Daugh Castle was a castle, about  north of Huntly, Aberdeenshire, Scotland, near Cairnie Burn.
It was also known as Castle of the Daach.

History
The property is said to have belonged to Thomas Gordon, known as Tam o Riven (or Ruthven), a character for whom it is difficult to sort fact from the legend.  It seems that Auchanachie Castle replaced Daugh Castle as the main residence in the 16th century.

Structure
Daugh Castle can now be identified only by a natural mound north of the farm of Little Daugh. It may well have been a timber structure, which has disappeared, although the access road remains. The castle had a strong position with a wide view of lower Strathisla.

See also
Castles in Great Britain and Ireland
List of castles in Scotland

References

Castles in Aberdeenshire